The following outline is provided as an overview of and topical guide to Oman:

Oman – sovereign country located in Southwest Asia along the eastern coast of the Arabian Peninsula.  Oman borders the United Arab Emirates on the northwest, Saudi Arabia on the west and Yemen on the southwest. The coast is formed by the Arabian Sea on the south and east and the Gulf of Oman on the northeast. The country also contains Madha, an exclave enclosed by the United Arab Emirates, and Musandam, an exclave also separated by Emirati territory.

General reference 

 Pronunciation:
 Common English country name:  Oman
 Official English country name:  The Sultanate of Oman
 Common endonym(s):  
 Official endonym(s):  
 Adjectival(s): Omani
 Demonym(s):
 Etymology: Name of Oman
 International rankings of Oman
 ISO country codes:  OM, OMN, 512
 ISO region codes:  See ISO 3166-2:OM
 Internet country code top-level domain:  .om

Geography of Oman 

Geography of Oman
 Oman is: a country
 Location:
 Northern Hemisphere and Eastern Hemisphere
 Eurasia
 Asia
 Southwest Asia
 Middle East
 Arabian Peninsula
 Time zone:  UTC+04
 Extreme points of Oman
 High:  Jabal Shams 
 Low:  Arabian Sea 0 m
 Land boundaries:  1,374 km
 676 km
 410 km
 288 km
 Coastline:  2,092 km
 Population of Oman: 2,595,000  - 139th most populous country

 Area of Oman: 309,500 km2
 Atlas of Oman

Environment of Oman 

 Climate of Oman
 Climate of Muscat
 Ecoregions in Oman
 Renewable energy in Oman
 Geology of Oman
 Protected areas of Oman
 Biosphere reserves in Oman
 National parks of Oman
 Wildlife of Oman
 Fauna of Oman
 Birds of Oman
 Mammals of Oman

Natural geographic features of Oman 
 Glaciers of Oman
 Islands of Oman
 Lakes of Oman
 Mountains of Oman
 Volcanoes in Oman
 Rivers of Oman
 Waterfalls of Oman
 Valleys of Oman
 World Heritage Sites in Oman

Regions of Oman 

Regions of Oman

Ecoregions of Oman 

List of ecoregions in Oman

Administrative divisions of Oman 

Administrative divisions of Oman
 Governorates of Oman
 Provinces of Oman

Governorates of Oman 

Governorates of Oman

Provinces of Oman 

Provinces of Oman

Municipalities of Oman 
 Capital of Oman: Muscat
 Cities of Oman

Demography of Oman 

Demographics of Oman

Government and politics of Oman 
Politics of Oman
 Form of government: absolute monarchy
 Capital of Oman: Muscat
 Elections in Oman
 Political parties in Oman

Branches of the government of Oman 

Government of Oman

Executive branch of the government of Oman 
 Head of state: Sultan of Oman,
 Head of government: Prime Minister of Oman,
 Cabinet of Oman

Legislative branch of the government of Oman 
 Parliament of Oman (bicameral) - since the Sultan has complete authority, Oman's parliament serves in an advisory capacity only
 Upper house: Council of State of Oman
 Lower house: Consultative Assembly of Oman

Judicial branch of the government of Oman 

Court system of Oman
 Supreme Court of Oman

Foreign relations of Oman 

Foreign relations of Oman
 Diplomatic missions in Oman
 Diplomatic missions of Oman

International organization membership 
The Sultanate of Oman is a member of:

Arab Bank for Economic Development in Africa (ABEDA)
Arab Fund for Economic and Social Development (AFESD)
Arab Monetary Fund (AMF)
Cooperation Council for the Arab States of the Gulf (GCC)
Food and Agriculture Organization (FAO)
Group of 77 (G77)
International Bank for Reconstruction and Development (IBRD)
International Civil Aviation Organization (ICAO)
International Criminal Court (ICCt) (signatory)
International Criminal Police Organization (Interpol)
International Development Association (IDA)
International Finance Corporation (IFC)
International Fund for Agricultural Development (IFAD)
International Hydrographic Organization (IHO)
International Labour Organization (ILO)
International Maritime Organization (IMO)
International Mobile Satellite Organization (IMSO)
International Monetary Fund (IMF)
International Olympic Committee (IOC)
International Organization for Standardization (ISO)
International Telecommunication Union (ITU)

International Telecommunications Satellite Organization (ITSO)
Inter-Parliamentary Union (IPU)
Islamic Development Bank (IDB)
League of Arab States (LAS)
Multilateral Investment Guarantee Agency (MIGA)
Nonaligned Movement (NAM)
Organisation of Islamic Cooperation (OIC)
Organisation for the Prohibition of Chemical Weapons (OPCW)
United Nations (UN)
United Nations Conference on Trade and Development (UNCTAD)
United Nations Educational, Scientific, and Cultural Organization (UNESCO)
United Nations Industrial Development Organization (UNIDO)
Universal Postal Union (UPU)
World Customs Organization (WCO)
World Federation of Trade Unions (WFTU)
World Health Organization (WHO)
World Intellectual Property Organization (WIPO)
World Meteorological Organization (WMO)
World Tourism Organization (UNWTO)
World Trade Organization (WTO)

Law and order in Oman 

Law of Oman
 Constitution of Oman
 Crime in Oman
 Human rights in Oman
 LGBT rights in Oman
 Freedom of religion in Oman
 Law enforcement in Oman
 Royal Oman Police

Military of Oman 

Military of Oman
 Command
 Commander-in-chief:
 Ministry of Defence of Oman
 Forces
 Royal Army of Oman
 Royal Navy of Oman
 Royal Air Force of Oman
 Royal Guard of Oman
 Military history of Oman
 Military ranks of Oman

Local government in Oman 

Local government in Oman

History of Oman 

History of Oman
Timeline of the history of Oman
Current events of Oman
 Military history of Oman

Culture of Oman 

Culture of Oman
 Archaeology of Oman
 Architecture of Oman
 Cuisine of Oman
 Festivals in Oman
 Languages of Oman
 Media in Oman
 Museums in Oman
 National symbols of Oman
 Flag of Oman
 National anthem of Oman
 National emblem of Oman
 People of Oman
 Prostitution in Oman
 Public holidays in Oman
 Records of Oman
 Religion in Oman
 Buddhism in Oman
 Christianity in Oman
 Hinduism in Oman
 Islam in Oman
 Judaism in Oman
 Sikhism in Oman
 World Heritage Sites in Oman
 Bahla Fort

Art in Oman 
 Art in Oman
 Cinema of Oman
 Literature of Oman
 Music of Oman
 Television in Oman
 Theatre in Oman

Sports in Oman 

Sports in Oman
 Football in Oman
 Oman at the Olympics
 Traditional Games
 List of traditional games in Oman

Economy and infrastructure of Oman 

Economy of Oman
 Economic rank, by nominal GDP (2007): 72nd (seventy-second)
 Buildings and structures in Oman
 Agriculture in Oman
 Banking in Oman
 National Bank of Oman
 Communications in Oman
 Internet in Oman
 Economy history in Oman
 Companies of Oman
Currency of Oman: Rial
ISO 4217: OMR
 Energy in Oman
 Energy policy of Oman
 Oil industry in Oman
 Health care in Oman
 Labor workers in Oman
 Mining in Oman
 Manufacturing industries in Oman
 Research and development in Oman
 Standard of living in Oman
 Trade and services in Oman
 Oman Stock Exchange
 Tourism in Oman
 Visa policy of Oman
 Transport in Oman
 Airports in Oman
 Rail transport in Oman
 Roads in Oman
 Water supply and sanitation in Oman

Education in Oman 

 Madrasa
 Maktaba
 Katateeb
 Masjid
 A'Sabla
 AL Barza

Structure of education in Oman 
 Elementary school in oman
 Secondary school in oman
 Higher education in oman

See also 

Oman
Index of Oman-related articles
List of international rankings
List of Oman-related topics
Member state of the United Nations
Outline of Asia
Outline of geography

References

External links 

 Government
Ministry of Information
Ministry of Foreign Affairs
Oman Tourism Portal
State Council
Majlis As-shura
About Oman

 Media
Oman News Agency
Oman News - From London
Oman state TV and Radio
Oman newspaper
Al-Watan newspaper
Al-Shabiba newspaper
Azzamn newspaper
Times of Oman
Oman Tribune
Oman Observer
The Week
PA Muscat 

 General information
Omani sites on the world heritage list
Online guide to Muscat 
Encyclopædia Britannica, Oman -  Country Page
BBC News Country Profile - Oman
CIA World Factbook - Oman
 Congressional Research Service (CRS) Reports regarding Oman
Oman Information & News

US State Department - Oman includes Background Notes, Country Study and major reports
Yahoo! - Oman directory category
Oman Travel & Tourism

Oman
 
Oman